Russell Cicerone (born November 17, 1994) is an American soccer player who currently plays for Sacramento Republic of the USL Championship.

Early life 
Russell Cicerone was born on November 17, 1994 to parents David and Mary. Cicerone grew up in Bloomfield Hills, Michigan, where he attended Brother Rice High School. Cicerone played on the school's soccer team, and served as team captain for one year. He also played soccer at Vardar Freiburg Academy as a high school senior.

Career

Amateur and college 
Cicerone spent four years playing college soccer at University at Buffalo between 2013 and 2016, where he scored 42 goals in 71 appearances, also tallying 22 assists.

Cicerone also appeared for USL PDL side Michigan Bucks in 2015 and 2016, helping to lead them to the league title in 2016

Professional 
On January 17, 2017, Cicerone was selected in the fourth round, 76th overall, of the 2017 MLS SuperDraft by Portland Timbers. Cicerone joined United Soccer League side Portland Timbers 2 on March 17, 2017.

Cicerone was announced to join USL side FC Cincinnati on November 21, 2017.

On December 16, 2018, Cicerone joined USL side Saint Louis FC ahead of their 2019 season.

Following Saint Louis FC folding at the end of the 2020 season, Cicerone joined USL Championship side Pittsburgh Riverhounds SC on December 17, 2020.

On December 2, 2022, Cicerone was announced as a new signing for USL Championship side Sacramento Republic ahead of the 2023 season.

Personal life 
At the University of Buffalo, Cicerone's academic major was biomedical sciences. Cicerone has an older sister, Anina, who also majored in biomedical sciences. She attended Western Michigan University, where she was a regular starter on the women's soccer team.

Cicerone is of Italian descent through his paternal grandfather.

References

External links

 Russell Cicerone at FC Cincinnati
 
 

1994 births
Living people
American soccer players
Buffalo Bulls men's soccer players
Flint City Bucks players
Portland Timbers 2 players
FC Cincinnati (2016–18) players
Saint Louis FC players
Association football forwards
Soccer players from Michigan
Portland Timbers draft picks
USL League Two players
National Premier Soccer League players
People from Bloomfield Hills, Michigan
FC Buffalo players
Pittsburgh Riverhounds SC players
Sacramento Republic FC players